Shaun MacGowan (born May 13 1988) is a UK-born violinist, keyboardist and guitarist, best known as the keyboardist and violinist of British doom metal band My Dying Bride. He replaced Katie Stone in 2009, and joined the band to tour the album For Lies I Sire. His first studio appearance with the group came on the 2009 EP Bring Me Victory, on which he played two tracks.

Shaun was a member of British death metal band Narcotic Death, joining on guitar to complete the band's original gigging line-up in 2008, appearing on the band's self-titled demo EP (2008) and album Anthology of the Damned (2010). He left in late 2010.

Equipment
 Yamaha Violins
 Korg Keyboards
 Schecter Guitars
 EMG Pickups

Discography

With Narcotic Death
Narcotic Death (EP, 2008)
Anthology of the Damned (full-length, 2010)

With My Dying Bride
Bring Me Victory (EP, 2009)
Evinta (full-length, 2011)
The Barghest O' Whitby (EP, 2009)
A Map of All Our Failures (full-length, 2012)
Feel The Misery (2015 album)
The Ghost of Orion (2020 album)

References

1988 births
Living people
Musicians from Dewsbury
English violinists